Budăi is a village in Telenești District, Moldova.

Notable people
 Ion Constantin Ciobanu
 Axentie Blanovschi

References

Villages of Telenești District